Henry Manni (born 18 June 1992) is a Finnish athlete and paracanoeist who has competed and medaled in both fields at World Championship level. In Paracanoeing he won a bronze medal in the K-1 200 m TA event at the 2010 ICF Canoe Sprint World Championships in Poznań. Manni later switched to athletics as a wheelchair sprinter in the T34 classification. In 2013 he won a bronze in the World Championships in the 200m event, following this with four golds in the 2014 European Championships and three further World championship medals in 2015.

Personal history
Manni was born in Lahti, Finland in 1992. He was born with paraparesis which saw his ability to walk unaided deteriorated from a young age. He obtained a degree in physical education from Pajulahti Sports Institute in Nastola. His younger brother Tuomas is also a para-athlete, competing in triathlon events.

As a paracanoeist
Manni was inspired to take up disability sport in 2004 after watching Finland's Leo-Pekka Tahti win gold at the Summer Paralympics in Athens. That year, at the age of ten, Manni took up paracanoeing. In 2010 he achieved his best paracanoe result when he won a bronze medal in the K-1 200 m TA event at the 2010 ICF Canoe Sprint World Championships in Poznań, Poland.

As a track athlete
After the 2010 Canoe World Championships Manni switched to track athletics and was classified as a T34 athlete. Specialising in sprint events he was selected for the Finland team at the 2013 IPC Athletics World Championships in Lyon. There he entered four events, the 100m, 200m, 400m and 800m sprints. He managed a podium finish in the 200m where he took bronze with a time of 30.70 seconds. The next year he travelled to Swansea where he competed in the 2014 IPC Athletics European Championships. Without the competition of international athletes such as Tunisia's Walid Ktila and Australia's Rheed McCracken, Manni dominated the field winning four gold medals in all four sprint events.

In the build up to the 2016 Summer Paralympics in Rio, Manni again represented Finland in the IPC World Championships, this time in Doha. He again entered all four sprint events in the T34 classification, and improved on all four times from his previous World Championship. In Doha he won a silver in the 400m and bronze in both the 200m and 800m events.

References

External links
2010 ICF Canoe Sprint World Championships men's K-1 200 m TA results. - accessed 20 August 2010.

Finnish male canoeists
Living people
1992 births
ICF Canoe Sprint World Championships medalists in paracanoe
TA classification paracanoeists
Paracanoeists of Finland
Finnish male wheelchair racers
Paralympic athletes of Finland
Sportspeople from Lahti
Athletes (track and field) at the 2016 Summer Paralympics
Paralympic bronze medalists for Finland
Paralympic medalists in athletics (track and field)
Medalists at the 2016 Summer Paralympics